The 1923 Central Michigan Normalites football team represented Central Michigan Normal School, later renamed Central Michigan University, as an independent during the 1923 college football season. In their third season under head coach Wallace Parker, the Central Michigan football team compiled a 5–1–2 record, shut out five of eight opponents, and outscored all opponents by a combined total of 160 to 24. The team's sole loss was to Albion by a 14–7 score.

Schedule

References

Central Michigan
Central Michigan Chippewas football seasons
Central Michigan Normalites football